Benjamin Nathan Cardozo (May 24, 1870 – July 9, 1938) was an American lawyer and jurist who served on the New York Court of Appeals from 1914 to 1932 and as an Associate Justice of the Supreme Court of the United States from 1932 until his death in 1938. Cardozo is remembered for his significant influence on the development of American common law in the 20th century, in addition to his philosophy and vivid prose style.

Born in New York City, Cardozo passed the bar in 1891 after attending Columbia Law School. He won an election to the New York Supreme Court in 1913 but joined the New York Court of Appeals the following year. He won election as Chief Judge of that court in 1926. As Chief Judge, he wrote majority opinions on cases such as Palsgraf v. Long Island Railroad Co.

In 1932, President Herbert Hoover appointed Cardozo to the U.S. Supreme Court to succeed Oliver Wendell Holmes Jr. Cardozo served on the Court until his death in 1938, and formed part of the liberal bloc of justices known as the Three Musketeers. He wrote the Court's majority opinion in notable cases such as Nixon v. Condon and Steward Machine Co. v. Davis.

Early life and family
Cardozo, the son of Rebecca Washington (née Nathan) and Albert Jacob Cardozo, was born in 1870 in New York City. Both Cardozo’s maternal grandparents, Sara Seixas and Isaac Mendes Seixas Nathan, and his paternal grandparents, Ellen Hart and Michael H. Cardozo, were Western Sephardim of the Portuguese-Jewish community, and affiliated with Manhattan’s Congregation Shearith Israel. Their ancestors had immigrated to the British colonies from London, England before the American Revolution.

The family were descended from Jewish-origin New Christian conversos. They left the Iberian Peninsula for Holland during the Inquisition. There they returned to the practice of Judaism. Cardozo family tradition held that their marrano (New Christians who maintained crypto-Jewish practices in secrecy) ancestors were from Portugal, although Cardozo’s ancestry has not been firmly traced to that country. But ”Cardozo” (archaic spelling of Cardoso), ”Seixas” and ”Mendes” are the Portuguese, rather than Spanish, spelling of those common Iberian surnames.

Benjamin Cardozo had a fraternal twin, his sister Emily. There were four other siblings, including an older sister Nell and older brother.

Benjamin was named for his uncle, Benjamin Nathan, a vice president of the New York Stock Exchange. He was murdered in 1870 and the case was never solved. Among their many cousins, given their deep history in the US, was the poet Emma Lazarus. Other earlier relations include Francis Lewis Cardozo (1836–1903), Thomas Cardozo, and Henry Cardozo, free men of color of Charleston, South Carolina. Francis became a Presbyterian minister in New Haven, Connecticut after education in Scotland, and was elected as Secretary of State of South Carolina during the Reconstruction era. Later he worked as an educator in Washington, DC under a Republican administration.

Albert Cardozo, Benjamin Cardozo’s father, was a judge on the Supreme Court of New York (the state’s general trial court) until 1868. He was implicated in a judicial corruption scandal, sparked by the Erie Railway takeover wars, and forced to resign. The scandal also led to the creation of the Association of the Bar of the City of New York. After leaving the court, the senior Cardozo practiced law for nearly two decades more until his death in 1885.

When Benjamin and Emily were young, their mother Rebecca died. The twins were raised during much of their childhood largely by their sister Nell, who was 11 years older. Benjamin remained devoted to her throughout his life.

Education
One of Benjamin’s tutors was Horatio Alger.
 
At age 15, Cardozo entered Columbia University where he was elected to Phi Beta Kappa. He was admitted to Columbia Law School in 1889. Cardozo wanted to enter a profession that could enable him to support himself and his siblings, but he also hoped to restore the family name, sullied by his father’s actions as a judge. Cardozo left law school after two years without a law degree.

Legal career

Law practice
Cardozo passed the bar in 1891 and began practicing appellate law alongside his older brother. Benjamin Cardozo practiced law in New York City until year-end 1913 with Simpson, Warren and Cardozo.

Interested in advancement and restoring the family name, Cardozo ran for a judgeship on the New York Supreme Court. In November 1913, Cardozo was elected by a large margin to a 14-year term on that court, taking office on January 1, 1914.

New York Court of Appeals
In February 1914, Cardozo was designated to the New York Court of Appeals under the Amendment of 1899. He was reportedly the first Jewish person to serve on the Court of Appeals.

In January 1917, he was appointed by the governor to a regular seat on the Court of Appeals to fill the vacancy caused by the resignation of Samuel Seabury. In November 1917, he was elected on the Democratic and Republican tickets to a 14-year term on the Court of Appeals.

In 1926, he was elected, on both tickets again, to a 14-year term as Chief Judge. He took office on January 1, 1927, and resigned on March 7, 1932 to accept an appointment to the United States Supreme Court.

His tenure was marked by a number of original rulings, in tort and contract law in particular. This is partly due to timing; rapid industrialization was forcing courts to look anew at old common law components to adapt to new settings.

In 1921, Cardozo gave the Storrs Lectures at Yale University, which were later published as The Nature of the Judicial Process (On line version), a book that remains valuable to judges today. Shortly thereafter, Cardozo became a member of the group that founded the American Law Institute, which crafted a Restatement of the Law of Torts, Contracts, and a host of other private law subjects. He wrote three other books that also became standards in the legal world.

While on the Court of Appeals, he criticized the exclusionary rule as developed by the federal courts, saying: ”The criminal is to go free because the constable has blundered”. He noted that many states had rejected the rule, but suggested that the adoption by the federal courts would affect the practice in the sovereign states.

United States Supreme Court

On February 15, 1932, President Herbert Hoover nominated Cardozo as an associate justice of the United States Supreme Court, to succeed Oliver Wendell Holmes. The New York Times said of Cardozo’s appointment that "seldom, if ever, in the history of the Court has an appointment been so universally commended." The Democrat Cardozo's appointment by a Republican president has been referred to as one of the few Supreme Court appointments in history that was not motivated by partisanship or politics, but strictly based on the nominee's contribution to law.

He was confirmed by the U.S. Senate on February 24, 1932, and was sworn into office on March 14. During a radio broadcast soon after Cardozo's confirmation, Clarence C. Dill, a Democratic senator from Washington, called Hoover's appointment of Cardozo "the finest act of his career as President." The entire faculty of the University of Chicago Law School had urged Hoover to nominate Cardozo, as did the deans of the law schools at Harvard, Yale, and Columbia. Justice Harlan Fiske Stone strongly urged Hoover to name Cardozo, even offering to resign to make room for him if Hoover had his heart set on someone else (Stone had suggested to Calvin Coolidge that he should nominate Cardozo in 1925 before Stone). Hoover originally demurred; he was concerned that there were already two justices from New York, and a Jew on the court. Justice James McReynolds was a notorious anti-Semite. When the chairman of the Senate Foreign Relations Committee, William E. Borah of Idaho, added his strong support for Cardozo, however, Hoover finally bowed to the pressure.

Cardozo was a member of the Three Musketeers, along with Brandeis and Stone, who were considered to be the liberal faction of the Supreme Court. In his years as an associate justice, Cardozo wrote opinions that stressed the necessity for the tightest adherence to the Tenth Amendment.

In his own words
Cardozo’s opinion of himself shows some of the same flair as his legal opinions:

In truth, I am nothing but a plodding mediocrity—please observe, a plodding mediocrity—for a mere mediocrity does not go very far, but a plodding one gets quite a distance. There is joy in that success, and a distinction can come from courage, fidelity and industry.

Honors
Cardozo received the honorary degree of LL.D. from several colleges and universities, including: Columbia (1915); Yale (1921); New York (1922); Michigan (1923); Harvard (1927); St. John’s (1928); St. Lawrence (1932); Williams (1932); Princeton (1932); Pennsylvania (1932); Brown (1933); and Chicago (1933).

Personal life

As an adult, Cardozo no longer practiced Judaism (he identified as an agnostic), but he was proud of his Jewish heritage.

Of the six children born to Albert and Rebecca Cardozo, only his twin sister Emily married. She and her husband did not have any children.

Constitutional law scholar Jeffrey Rosen noted in a New York Times Book Review of Richard Polenberg’s book on Cardozo:

In late 1937, Cardozo had a heart attack, and in early 1938, he suffered a stroke. He died on July 9, 1938, at the age of 68. He was buried in Beth Olam Cemetery in Queens.

Ethnicity
Cardozo was the second Jewish justice to be appointed to the Supreme Court. The first was Louis Brandeis, whose family was Ashkenazi.

Cardozo was born into the Spanish and Portuguese Jewish community, which had traditions distinct from the Ashkenazi. Since the appointment of Justice Sonia Sotomayor in the 21st century, some commentators have suggested that Cardozo should be considered the ”first Hispanic justice”.

In response to this controversy, Cardozo biographer Kaufman questioned the usage of the term ”Hispanic” in Justice Cardozo’s lifetime, stating: ”Well, I think he regarded himself as a Sephardic Jew whose ancestors came from the Iberian Peninsula”. After centuries in British North America, Cardozo "confessed in 1937 that his family preserved neither the Spanish language nor Iberian cultural traditions”. Ancestors had lived in England, the British colonies, and the United States since the 17th century.

Some Latino advocacy groups, such as the National Association of Latino Elected Officials and the Hispanic National Bar Association, consider Sonia Sotomayor to be the first Hispanic justice, as in their view she was raised in Hispanic culture.

Cases
New York Courts
Schloendorff v. Society of New York Hospital, 105 N.E. 92 (1914) it is necessary to get informed consent from a patient before operation, but a non-profit hospital was not vicariously liable (the latter aspect was reversed in 1957)
MacPherson v. Buick Motor Co., 111 N.E. 1050 (1916) ending privity as a prerequisite to duty in product liability by ruling that manufacturers of products could be held liable for injuries to consumers even if they were not in privity.
De Cicco v. Schweizer, 117 N.E. 807 (1917) where Cardozo approached the issue of third party beneficiary law in a contract for marriage case.
Wood v. Lucy, Lady Duff-Gordon, 118 N.E. 214 (1917) on an implied promise to do something constituting consideration in a contract.
Martin v. Herzog, 126 N.E. 814 (1920) breach of statutory duty establishes negligence, and the elements of the claim includes proof of causation
Jacob & Youngs v. Kent, 230 N.Y. 239 (1921), substantial performance of a contract does not lead to a right to terminate, only damages.
Hynes v. New York Central Railroad Company, 131 N.E. 898 (1921), a railway owed a duty of care despite the victims being trespassers.
Glanzer v Shepard, 233 N.Y. 236, 135 N.E. 275, 23 A.L.R. 1425 (1922), a Caballero bean weighing dispute, with duties imposed by law but growing out of contract
Berkey v. Third Avenue Railway, 244 N.Y. 84 (1926), the corporate veil cannot be pierced, even in favor of a tort victim unless domination of a subsidiary by the parent is complete.
Wagner v. International Railway, 232 N.Y. 176 (1926) the rescue doctrine. ”Danger invites rescue. The cry of distress is the summons to relief [...] The emergency begets the man. The wrongdoer may not have foreseen the coming of a deliverer. He is accountable as if he had”.
Meinhard v. Salmon, 164 N.E. 545 (1928) the fiduciary duty of business partners is, ”Not honesty alone, but the punctilio of an honor the most sensitive”.
Palsgraf v. Long Island Railroad Co., 162 N.E. 99 (1928) the development of the concept of the proximate cause in tort law.
Jessie Schubert v. August Schubert Wagon Company, 164 N.E. 42 (1929) Respondeat superior and spousal immunity relationship are not related.
Murphy v. Steeplechase Amusement Park, 166 N.E. 173 (1929) denied a right to recover for knee injury from riding ”The Flopper” funride since the victim ”assumed the risk”.
Ultramares v. Touche, 174 N.E. 441 (1931) on the limitation of liability of auditors

US Supreme Court
Nixon v. Condon, 286 U.S. 73 (1932) all white Texas Democratic Party primary unconstitutional
Welch v. Helvering, 290 U.S. 111 (1933) which concerns Internal Revenue Code Section 162 and the meaning of ”ordinary” business deductions.
Panama Refining Co. v. Ryan, 293 U.S. 388 (1935) dissenting from a narrow interpretation of the Commerce Clause.
A.L.A. Schechter Poultry Corp. v. United States, 295 U.S. 495 (1935), concurring in the invalidation of poultry regulations as outside the commerce clause power.
Carter v. Carter Coal Company, 298 U.S. 238 (1936) dissenting over the scope of the Commerce Clause.
Steward Machine Company v. Davis, 301 U.S. 548 (1937) unemployment compensation and social security were constitutional
Helvering v. Davis, 301 U.S. 619 (1937) social security not a contributory programme
Palko v. Connecticut, 302 U.S. 319 (1937) the due process clause incorporated those rights which were ”implicit in the concept of ordered liberty”.

Schools, organizations, and buildings named after Cardozo
 Benjamin N. Cardozo School of Law at Yeshiva University in New York City
 Cardozo College, a dormitory building at Stony Brook University in Stony Brook, New York
 Benjamin N. Cardozo Lodge #163, Knights of Pythias
 Benjamin N. Cardozo High School in the borough of Queens in New York City
 The Cardozo Hotel, 1300 Ocean Drive, Miami, Florida

Bibliography
 Cardozo, Benjamin N. (1921), The Nature of the Judicial Process, The Storrs Lectures Delivered at Yale University.
Cardozo, Benjamin N. (1924), The Growth of the Law, 5 Additional Lectures Delivered at Yale University.
 
Cardozo, Benjamin N. (1931), Law and Literature and Other Essays and Addresses.
 Cardozo, Benjamin N. (1889), The Altruist in Politics, commencement oration at Columbia College, Gutenberg Project version.

See also
 Demographics of the Supreme Court of the United States
 List of justices of the Supreme Court of the United States
 List of law clerks of the Supreme Court of the United States (Seat 2)
 List of United States Supreme Court justices by time in office
 United States Supreme Court cases during the Hughes Court
 List of first minority male lawyers and judges in New York

Notes

Further reading

 
 Cardozo, Benjamin N. (1957). An Introduction to Law. Cambridge: Harvard Law Review Association. (Chapters by eight distinguished American judges).
 
 Cardozo, Benjamin N. [1870–1938]. Essays Dedicated to Mr. Justice Cardozo. [N.p.]: Published by Columbia Law Review, Harvard Law Review, Yale Law Journal, 1939. [143] pp. Contributors: Harlan Fiske Stone, the Rt. Hon. Lord Maugham, Herbert Vere Evatt, Learned Hand, Irving Lehman, Warren Seavey, Arthur L. Corbin, Felix Frankfurter. Also includes a reprint of Cardozo’s essay ”Law And Literature” with a foreword by James M. Landis.
 
 
 Frankfurter, Felix, Mr. Justice Cardozo and Public Law, Columbia Law Review 39 (1939): 88–118, Harvard Law Review 52 (1939): 440–470, Yale Law Journal 48 (1939): 458–488.
 
 

 
 
 
 
 Seavey, Warren A., Mr. Justice Cardozo and the Law of Torts, Columbia Law Review 39 (1939): 20–55, Harvard Law Review 52 (1939): 372–407, Yale Law Journal 48 (1939): 390–425

External links

 
 
 
 
 Benjamin Cardozo at Michael Ariens.com.
 History of the Court, the Hughes Court at Supreme Court Historical Society.
 Listing and portrait of Benjamin N. Cardozo, New York Court of Appeals judge at Historical Society of the Courts of the State of New York.
 Oyez Project, U.S. Supreme Court media, Benjamin N. Cardozo.

|-

1870 births
1938 deaths
19th-century Sephardi Jews
20th-century Sephardi Jews
20th-century American judges
American agnostics
American people of English-Jewish descent
American people of Portuguese-Jewish descent
American Sephardic Jews
Burials at Beth Olom Cemetery
Chief Judges of the New York Court of Appeals
Columbia Law School alumni
Jewish agnostics
Jewish American attorneys
Judges of the New York Court of Appeals
New York (state) Democrats
New York Supreme Court Justices
Lawyers from New York City
United States federal judges appointed by Herbert Hoover
Justices of the Supreme Court of the United States
Yale Law School faculty
Columbia College (New York) alumni